Casuarina is a genus of 17 tree species in the family Casuarinaceae, native to Australia, the Indian subcontinent, southeast Asia, islands of the western Pacific Ocean, and eastern Africa. It was once treated as the sole genus in the family, but has since been split into four genera (see: Casuarinaceae).

The slender, green to grey-green twigs bearing minute scale-leaves in whorls of 5–20. The apetalous flowers are produced in small catkin-like inflorescences. Most species are dioecious, but a few are monoecious. The fruit is a woody, oval structure superficially resembling a conifer cone, made up of numerous carpels, each containing a single seed with a small wing. The generic name is derived from the Malay word for the cassowary, kasuari, alluding to the similarities between the bird's feathers and the plant's foliage, though the tree is called ru in Modern Malay.

Karen Louise Wilson and Lawrence Alexander Sidney Johnson distinguish the two very closely related genera, Casuarina and Allocasuarina on the basis of:
Casuarina: the mature samaras being grey or yellow brown, and dull; cone bracteoles thinly woody, prominent, extending well beyond cone body, with no dorsal protuberance;
Allocasuarina: the mature samaras being red brown to black, and shiny; cone bracteoles thickly woody and convex, mostly extending only slightly beyond cone body, and usually with a separate angular, divided or spiny dorsal protuberance.

Ecology
Casuarina species are a food source of the larvae of hepialid moths; members of the genus Aenetus, including A. lewinii and A. splendens, burrow horizontally into the trunk then vertically down. Endoclita malabaricus also feeds on Casuarina. The noctuid turnip moth is also recorded feeding on Casuarina.

Pedunculagin, casuarictin, strictinin, casuarinin and casuariin are ellagitannins found in the species within the genus.

Invasive species

C. cunninghamiana, C. glauca and C. equisetifolia have become naturalized in many countries, including Argentina, Bermuda, Cayman Islands, Cuba,  China, Egypt, Israel, Iraq, Mauritius, Kenya, Mexico, Brazil, South Africa, the Bahamas, and Uruguay. They are considered an invasive species in the United States, especially in southern Florida where they have nearly quadrupled in number between 1993 and 2005 and are called the Australian pine.
C. equisetifolia is widespread in the Hawaiian Islands where it grows both on the seashore in dry, salty, calcareous soils and up in the mountains in high rainfall areas on volcanic soils. It is also an invasive plant in Bermuda, where it was introduced to replace the Juniperus bermudiana windbreaks killed by a scale insect in the 1940s.

Species List
Casuarina comprises the following species:
 Casuarina collina Poiss. ex Pancher & Sebert
 Casuarina cristata Miq. (northeastern Australia: Queensland, New South Wales).
 Casuarina cunninghamiana Miq. – river she-oak (northern and eastern Australia: Northern Territory to New South Wales)
 Casuarina equisetifolia L. – beach she-oak, common ironwood, Australian pine (Florida), casuarina, whistling pine (northern Australia, southeastern Asia, doubtfully native to Madagascar), ঝাউ in বাংলা (Bengali), ಗಾಳಿ ಮರ (gaali mara) in Kannada.
 Casuarina glauca Sieber ex Spreng. grey she-oak, longleaf ironwood, saltmarsh ironwood, swamp oak (New South Wales)
 Casuarina grandis L.A.S.Johnson (New Guinea)
 Casuarina junghuhniana Miq. (Indonesia)
 Casuarina obesa Miq. (southern Australia: southwestern Western Australia, New South Wales [one site, now extirpated], Victoria)
 Casuarina oligodon L.A.S.Johnson (New Guinea)
 Casuarina orophila L.A.S.Johnson
 Casuarina pauper F.Muell. ex L.A.S.Johnson (Australia)
 Casuarina potamophila Schltr.
 Casuarina tenella Schltr.
 Casuarina teres Schltr.

Species names with uncertain taxonomic status
The status of the following species is unresolved:
 Casuarina defungens L.A.S. Johnson
 Casuarina hexagona Dehnh.
 Casuarina litorea Rumph.
 Casuarina lucida Dehnh.
 Casuarina prisea Miq.

Formerly placed here

 Allocasuarina acuaria (F. Muell.) L.A.S.Johnson (as C. acuaria F.Muell.)
 Allocasuarina acutivalvis (F. Muell.) L.A.S.Johnson (as C. acutivalvis F.Muell.)
 Allocasuarina campestris (Diels) L.A.S.Johnson (as C. campestris Diels)
 Allocasuarina corniculata (F.Muell.) L.A.S.Johnson (as C. corniculata F.Muell.)
 Allocasuarina decussata (Benth.) L.A.S.Johnson (as C. decussata Benth.)
 Allocasuarina distyla (Vent.) L.A.S.Johnson (as C. distyla Vent.)
 Allocasuarina drummondiana (Miq.) L.A.S.Johnson (as C. drummondiana Miq.)
 Allocasuarina fibrosa (C.A.Gardner) L.A.S.Johnson (as C. fibrosa C.A.Gardner)
 Allocasuarina fraseriana (Miq.) L.A.S.Johnson (as C. fraseriana Miq.)
 Allocasuarina grevilleoides (Diels) L.A.S.Johnson (as C. grevilleoides Diels)
 Allocasuarina helmsii (Ewart & Gordon) L.A.S.Johnson (as C. helmsii Ewart & Gordon)
 Allocasuarina huegeliana (Miq.) L.A.S.Johnson (as C. huegeliana Miq.)
 Allocasuarina humilis (Otto & A. Dietr.) L.A.S.Johnson (as C. humilis Otto & A.Dietr.)
 Allocasuarina inophloia (F. Muell. & F. M. Bailey) L.A.S.Johnson (as C. inophloia F.Muell. & F.M.Bailey)
 Allocasuarina lehmanniana subsp. lehmanniana (as C. baxteriana Miq. or C. lehmanniana Miq.)
 Allocasuarina littoralis (Salisb.) L.A.S.Johnson (as C. littoralis Salisb. or C. suberosa Otto & A.Dietr.)
 Allocasuarina luehmannii (R.T.Baker) L.A.S.Johnson (as C. luehmannii R.T.Baker)
 Allocasuarina muelleriana (Miq.) L.A.S.Johnson (as C. muelleriana Miq.)
 Allocasuarina nana (Sieber ex Spreng.) L.A.S.Johnson (as C. nana Sieber ex Spreng.)
 Allocasuarina paludosa (Sieber ex Spreng.) L.A.S.Johnson (as C. paludosa Sieber ex Spreng.)
 Allocasuarina pusilla (Macklin) L.A.S.Johnson (as C. pusilla Macklin)
 Allocasuarina thuyoides (Miq.) L.A.S.Johnson (as C. thuyoides Miq.)
 Allocasuarina torulosa (Aiton) L.A.S.Johnson (as C. tenuissima Sieber ex Spreng. or C. torulosa Aiton)
 Allocasuarina trichodon (Miq.) L.A.S.Johnson (as C. trichodon Miq.)
 Allocasuarina verticillata (Lam.) L.A.S.Johnson (as C. quadrivalvis Labill., C. stricta Aiton or C. verticillata Lam.)
 Gymnostoma deplancheanum (Miq.) L.A.S.Johnson (as C. deplancheana Miq.)
 Gymnostoma nodiflorum (Thunb.) L.A.S.Johnson (as C. angulata J.Poiss. or C. nodiflora Thunb.)
 Gymnostoma papuanum (S. Moore) L.A.S.Johnson (as C. papuana S.Moore)
 Gymnostoma rumphianum (Miq.) L.A.S.Johnson (as C. rumphiana Miq.)
 Gymnostoma sumatranum (Jungh. ex de Vriese) L.A.S.Johnson (as C. sumatrana Jungh. ex de Vriese)

References

External Links

 
Fagales genera